San Javier is a town in Loreto Municipality, Baja California Sur. Located in Western Mexico, the village had a population of 131 inhabitants at the census of 2010. San Ignacio is home to Misión San Francisco Javier de Viggé-Biaundó.

Transportation

It is approximately 36 km southwest of Loreto on a paved road.

References
2010 census tables: INEGI: Instituto Nacional de Estadística, Geografía e Informática

External links
Official Ayuntamiento de Loreto website (Municipality of Loreto)—

Populated places in Baja California Sur
Loreto Municipality (Baja California Sur)